Harald Sunde (born 9 March 1954 in Hurdal) is a Norwegian military officer. He has served as the head of the Norwegian Armed Forces from 1 October 2009 through November 2013.

References

1954 births
Living people
People from Hurdal
Norwegian Army generals
Chiefs of Defence (Norway)
Bundeswehr Command and Staff College alumni